The Romantic ballet is defined primarily by an era in ballet in which the ideas of Romanticism in art and literature influenced the creation of ballets. The era occurred during the early to mid 19th century primarily at the Théâtre de l'Académie Royale de Musique of the Paris Opera Ballet and Her Majesty's Theatre in London. It is typically considered to have begun with the 1827 début in Paris of the ballerina Marie Taglioni in the ballet La Sylphide, and to have reached its zenith with the premiere of the divertissement Pas de Quatre staged by the Ballet Master Jules Perrot in London in 1845. The Romantic ballet had no immediate end, but rather a slow decline. Arthur Saint-Léon's 1870 ballet Coppélia is considered to be the last work of the Romantic Ballet.

During this era, the development of pointework, although still at a fairly basic stage, profoundly affected people's perception of the ballerina.  Many lithographs of the period show her virtually floating, poised only on the tip of a toe.  This idea of weightlessness was capitalised on in ballets such as La Sylphide and Giselle, and the famous leap apparently attempted by Carlotta Grisi in La Péri.

Other features which distinguished Romantic ballet were the separate identity of the scenarist or author from the choreographer, and the use of specially written music as opposed to a pastiche typical of the ballet of the late 18th and early 19th centuries.  The invention of gas lighting enabled gradual changes and enhanced the mysteriousness of many ballets with its softer gleam.  Illusion became more diverse with wires and trap doors being widely used.

Cult of the ballerina 

The Romantic era marked the rise of the ballerina as a central part of ballet, where previously men had dominated performances. There had always been admiration for superior dancers, but elevating ballerinas to the level of celebrity came into its own in the nineteenth century, especially as female performers became idealized and objectified. Marie Taglioni became the prototypical Romantic ballerina, praised highly for her lyricism.  The movement style for Romantic ballerinas was characterized by soft, rounded arms and a forward tilt in the upper body.  This gave the woman a flowery, willowy look.  Leg movements became more elaborate due to the new tutu length and rising standards of technical proficiency. Important Romantic ballerinas included Marie Taglioni, Carlotta Grisi, Lucille Grahn, Fanny Cerrito, Pauline Leroux and Fanny Elssler. The plots of many ballets were dominated by spirit women—sylphs, wilis, and ghosts, who enslaved the hearts and senses of mortal men and made it impossible for them to live happily in the real world.

While ballerinas became increasingly virtuosic, male dancers became scarce, particularly in Paris (although they were still common in other European areas, such as Denmark). This led to the rise of the female travesty dancer - a female dancer who played male roles. While travesty dancing had existed prior to the romantic period it was generally used in tableau and walk-on (marcheuse) parts. Now it became a high-status occupation, and a number of prima ballerinas made their names by dancing en travestie. Fanny Elssler and her sister both played travesty parts. The most well known travesty dancer was Eugénie Fiocre, who was the first dancer to play Frantz in Coppélia, as well as a number of ballerina roles.

Design and scenography

Romantic tutu

The costume for the Romantic ballerina was the romantic tutu.  This was a full, white, multi-layered skirt made of tulle.  The ballerina wore a white bodice with the tutu.  In the second acts of Romantic ballets, representing the spiritual realm, the corps de ballet appeared on stage in Romantic tutus, giving rise to the term "white act" or ballet-blanc. The dancers wore pointe shoes to give the effect of floating.

Special effects

Romantic ballet owed much to the new developments in theatre effects, particularly gas lighting.  Candles had been previously used to light theatres, but gas lighting allowed for dimming effects and other subtleties.  Combined with the effects of the Romantic tutu, ballerinas posing en pointe, and the use of wires to make dancers "fly," directors used gas lighting to create supernatural spectacles on stage.

Famous ballets

 La Somnambule (1827)
 La Sylphide (1832)
 Le Diable boiteux (1836)
 La Fille du Danube (1836)
 La Gipsy (1839)
 Le Diable amoureux (1840)
 Giselle (1841)
 La Jolie Fille de Gand (1842)
 La Péri (1843)
 Ondine (1843)
 La Vivandière or Markitenka (1844)
 La Esmeralda (1844)
 Éoline, ou La Dryade (1845)
 Le Diable à Quatre (1845)
 Pas de Quatre (1845)
 Catarina, or La Fille du Bandit (1846)
 Le Jugement de Paris (1846)
 Paquita (1846)
 La Fille de marbre (1847)
 Electra, ou La Pléiade perdue (1849)
 Le Violon du diable (1849)
 La Filleule des fées (1849)
 Les Métamorphoses (1850)
 Vert-Vert (1851)
 Le Corsaire (1856)
 Le Papillon (1861)
 Coppélia (1870)

Notable choreographers 

 Albert
 Jean Coralli
 Joseph Mazilier
 Jules Perrot
 Marius Petipa
 Arthur Saint-Léon
 Filippo Taglioni
 Paul Taglioni

Notable composers 

 Adolphe Adam
 Cesare Pugni

Notable theatres 

 Her Majesty's Theatre, London
 Théâtre de l'Académie Royale de Musique of the Paris Opera Ballet

References

Romanticism
Ballet terminology